The following list of mines in the Philippines is subsidiary to the Lists of mines in Asia article and Lists of mines articles. This list contains working, defunct and future mines in the country and is organised by the primary mineral output(s) and province. For practical purposes stone, marble and other quarries may be included in this list. Operational mines are demarcated by bold typeface, future mines are demarcated in italics.

Coal
Malangas Coal Reservation - Malangas, Zamboanga Sibugay
Panian Open Pit Mine - Semirara Island, Caluya, Antique

Copper
Boyongan mine
Canatuan mine
Tampakan mine

Gold
Canatuan mine

Nickel
Rio Tuba mine

 Rio Tuba Nickel Mining Corporation                        
 Berong Nickel Corporation
 San Roque Metals Incorporated (SRMI)
 Agata Mining Ventures, Inc. (AMVI)
 Platinum Group Metals Corporation (PGMC)
 Taganito Mining Corporation (TMC)
 CTP Construction and Mining Corporation
 ADNAMA Mining Resources Corporation
 Claver Mineral Development Corporation
 VTP Mining and Construction Inc.
 Macventures Mining and Development Corporation (MMDC)
 Carrascal Nickel Corporation (CNC)
 Hinatuan Mining Corporation (HMC)
 Cagdianao Mining Corporation (CMC)
 Libjo Mining Corporation (LMC)
 AAM-Phil Natural Resources Exploration &Devt. Corp.
 Century Peak Corporation (CPC)
 BenguetCorp Nickel Mines Incorporated
 Eramen Minerals Incorporated
 LNL Archipelago Minerals Incorporated
 Zambales Diversified Metals Corporation
 Pax Libera Mining Inc. (PLMI) 

Philippines